Adolfo Raúl Taylhardat (6 May 1934 – 9 July 2017) was a Venezuelan diplomat. A graduate in international studies (1957; doctorate 1960) and law (1965) from the Central University of Venezuela, he occupied a range of diplomatic posts since entering Venezuela's diplomatic service in 1955. Taylhardat was Venezuelan Permanent Representative of Venezuela to the United Nations from August 1993 and was President of the Security Council (September 1993), during Venezuela's membership of the Security Council.

He died on 9 July 2017.

References

1934 births
2017 deaths
Permanent Representatives of Venezuela to the United Nations
Central University of Venezuela alumni
Ambassadors of Venezuela to France